HM Prison Kirklevington Grange is a Category D men's prison, and young offenders institute located in the village of Kirklevington (near Yarm), in North Yorkshire, England. The prison is operated by His Majesty's Prison Service.

History
Kirklevington Grange Prison was originally opened in 1965 as a mixed remand centre and also a detention centre. In October 1992 the jail was converted into a resettlement prison for adult male offenders.

In March 2004 the Independent Monitoring Board issued a report on Kirklevington Grange praising the fair and respectful atmosphere at the prison, despite a 22% rise in the number of inmates. The Board also commended the good links between the prison and the local population and the access to job centres for the prisoners.

In January 2006 an inspection report from Her Majesty's Chief Inspector of Prisons praised Kirklevington Grange for its excellent resettlement work. The report also praised the positive attitude amongst staff at the prison. However the report recommended that the quality and range of work opportunities for prisoners should be improved at the jail.

A 2011 report following inspection of the prison found that it was a safe environment with a high standard achieved in diversity work, health care and catering.

In January 2014 a prisoner escaped from the jail.

The prison today
Kirklevington Grange is a resettlement prison for Category D adult male offenders nearing the end of their sentences, who are intending to settle in the north-east of England. Accommodation at the prison comprises single rooms with fitted storage cupboards. All rooms have privacy locks,  having their own key.

The prison's aim is to prepare inmates for their release. Prisoners are therefore encouraged to maintain and develop links with families and the wider community. Prisoners can in the final stages of their sentence progress to working out of the prison in full-time employment or voluntary community work.

The prison is currently managed by HM Prison Service.

Kirklevington Grange

Kirklevington Grange was a country house remodelled and extended in the 1892-1898 period to designs by E. J. May. The structure, which is listed as a Grade II building, is now incorporated into the main prison complex.

Notable inmates
 Andy Ferrell, former professional footballer who received a four-year sentence in 2013 for drug dealing.

References

External links

 Ministry of Justice pages on Kirklevington Grange

Category C prisons in England
Category D prisons in England
Prisons in North Yorkshire
1992 establishments in England
Men's prisons